State Highway 2 (Andhra Pradesh) is a state highway in the Indian state of Andhra Pradesh

Route 

It starts at SH 42 Junction and passes through Chintalapudi – Vijayarai and ends at Tangellamudi in Eluru.

Junctions and interchanges

See also 
 List of State Highways in Andhra Pradesh

References 

Transport in Eluru
State Highways in Andhra Pradesh
Roads in West Godavari district